Luis Arcadio García Bañuelos (born 25 March 1993) is a Mexican professional footballer who plays as a forward for Liga MX club Puebla, on loan from Necaxa.

References

1993 births
Living people
Sportspeople from Mazatlán
Mexican footballers
Footballers from Sinaloa
Association football forwards
C.F. Pachuca players
Murciélagos FC footballers
Tlaxcala F.C. players
Pioneros de Cancún footballers
Loros UdeC footballers
Alebrijes de Oaxaca players
Liga MX players
Ascenso MX players
Liga Premier de México players
Tercera División de México players